The Territory of Nevada (N.T.) was an organized incorporated territory of the United States that existed from March 2, 1861, until October 31, 1864, when it was admitted to the Union as the State of Nevada.

Prior to the creation of the Nevada Territory, the area was part of western Utah Territory and was known as Washoe, after the native Washoe people. The separation of the territory from Utah was important to the federal government because of its political leanings, while the population itself was keen to be separated because of animosity (and sometimes violence) between non-Mormons in Nevada and Mormons from the rest of the Utah Territory.

History

The Northwest Ordinance of 1787 allowed a state to be admitted, "Provided, the constitution and government so to be formed, shall be republican, and in conformity to the principles contained in these articles; and, so far as it can be consistent with the general interest of the confederacy, such admission shall be allowed at an earlier period, and when there may be a less number of free inhabitants in the State than sixty thousand."

The eastern boundary of Nevada Territory had been defined as the 39th meridian west from Washington, but when gold discoveries were made to the east the Nevada territorial delegation to Congress requested the boundary be moved east to the 38th meridian, which Congress granted in 1862. The border was shifted further east, to the 37th meridian, in 1866, in part due to the discovery of more gold deposits. These eastward shifts took land away from Utah Territory. The southern border of Nevada Territory had been defined as the 37th parallel, but in 1866 Nevada asked Congress to move the border south to the Colorado River. Congress granted the request in 1867, giving Nevada all of the western end of Arizona Territory. Arizona strongly protested, but found little sympathy in Congress due in part to Arizona having aligned with the Confederacy during the Civil War.

The exact location of the due north-south California–Nevada border, between Lake Tahoe and the intersection with the southern boundary of Oregon at the 42nd parallel, was contentious and was surveyed and re-surveyed well into the 20th century.

Congress transferred some of the lands west of the Colorado River including Pah-Ute County, Arizona Territory to the State of Nevada on May 5, 1866. Part of this southern tip of Nevada was established as Clark County in 1909 and contains the city of Las Vegas.

The territorial capital was moved from the provisional capital of Genoa to Carson City. James Warren Nye succeeded Isaac Roop, the first provisional territorial governor, and became the only territorial governor. The secretary of the territory was Orion Clemens (older brother of Samuel Clemens, also known as Mark Twain), who more or less served as governor in Nye's constant absence.

See also
 
 
 
 California Trail
 Great Basin
 Historic regions of the United States
 History of Nevada
 Territorial evolution of the United States
 Mexican Cession, 1848
 State of Deseret, 1849–1850 (extralegal)

References

External links

 Norrico.com: collecting Nevada Territory stocks & bonds

 

1860s in Nevada
1861 establishments in Nevada Territory
1861 establishments in New Mexico Territory
1861 establishments in Utah Territory
1864 disestablishments in the United States
Former organized territories of the United States
History of Nevada
History of the American West
New Mexico Territory
Utah Territory